Arthur Wilberforce Jose (4 September 1863 – 22 January 1934) 
was an English-Australian historian and editor of the Australian Encyclopaedia.

Jose was born at Bristol, South West England, eldest son of William Wilberforce Jose, and his wife Sarah Maria, née Woodward. W. W. Jose was chairman of Bristol School Board's technical education committee and a governor of University College, Bristol. Arthur Jose was educated at Clifton College, where he obtained a scholarship which took him to Balliol College, Oxford. About a year later Jose's health broke down and he was sent to Australia in 1882 to recuperate. His father lost his fortune and a return to Oxford became impossible. Jose was offered a clerical position in Sydney but preferred to get Australian experience working in the country as a wood-chopper, cook, and fencing contractor. Jose then went to Hobart and was a tutor in a private family. While in Tasmania he met the Rev. Edwin Bean, headmaster of All Saints' College, Bathurst, New South Wales, who offered him a position as assistant master. He was there for about nine years. 

In 1888, under the pseudonym of "Ishmael Dare", Jose published a volume of poems, Sun and Cloud on River and Sea, a collection of musical verses. He was appointed acting-professor of modern literature at Sydney University in 1893, and from 1893 to 1899 was organizing secretary of the university extension board. He was a friend of David Scott Mitchell, founder of the Mitchell Library. In September 1899 his History of Australia was published which was afterwards several times revised. The tenth edition, published in 1924, brought the number of copies issued up to 60,000. Jose then went to South Africa and for a short period was a war correspondent. Travelling then to London Jose published The Growth of the Empire (1901) and in 1902 was appointed professor of English and History at the Muhammadan Anglo-Oriental College, Aligarh, India. Jose soon returned to London where he became interested in the Imperial Tariff and Tariff Reform League, did some writing for the press, and in 1903 was appointed The Times correspondent in Australia. He held this position from 1904 to 1915 and fearlessly endeavored to set out the Australian point of view. His Two Awheel and Some Others Afoot in Australia was published in London in 1903 with illustrations by George Washington Lambert.

In 1915 Jose resigned his position with The Times and was attached to the intelligence branch of the Royal Australian Navy with the rank of captain. After the war Jose was appointed editor of the Australian Encyclopaedia, the first volume of which appeared in 1925 and the second in 1926. In 1920 he commenced writing the volume on the Royal Australian Navy in the Official History of Australia in the War of 1914-1918 which appeared in 1928,
as did also his Builders and Pioneers of Australia. Jose was in Europe between 1927 and 1932 and did reviewing for the Times Literary Supplement and other publications. His Australia Human and Economic appeared in 1932, and in January 1933 he returned to Australia and published The Romantic Nineties, a volume of essays and reminiscences. Jose died at Brisbane on 22 January 1934 of peritonitis and was buried in Toowong Cemetery,  with Anglican rites. He was survived by his wife and a son.

References

1863 births
1934 deaths
Australian people of English descent
People educated at Clifton College
Academic staff of Aligarh Muslim University
Royal Australian Navy officers
Australian Anglicans
Burials at Toowong Cemetery
Australian encyclopedists
Australian naval historians
20th-century Australian historians